Frank Swaelen (23 March 1930 – 23 December 2007) was a Belgian Christian Democratic politician and member of the Christian People's Party (CVP). He was born in Antwerp. In 1968, he became a member of the Chamber of Representatives. He became Minister of Defence in 1980 but one year later he became the national chairman of the CVP, which he remained until 1988, when he became the President of the Senate.

He became a Minister of State in 1995 and retired from active politics in 1999 after having presided over the Senate for more than 10 years.

He died on 23 December 2007 in Antwerp.

Honours 
Swaelen received the following honours:

 Grand cordon in the Order of Leopold
 Knight Grand Cross in the Order of the Crown
 Knight Grand Cross in the Order of Leopold II
 Knight Grand Cross in the Order of the Oak Crown
 Knight Grand Cross in the Order of Al Merito Bernardo O'Higgins
 Knight Grand Cross in the Order of Merit of the Federal Republic of Germany

Political career
1964–1966: National chairman of the CVP Youth
1966–1976: General political secretary of the CVP
1968–1985: Member of the Chamber of Representatives
1971–1988: Mayor of Hove
1980–1981: Minister of Defence
1981–1988: National chairman of the CVP
1985–1999: Senator
1988–1999: President of the Senate

References

External links
 Frank Swaelen in ODIS - Online Database for Intermediary Structures 
 Archives of Frank Swaelen in ODIS - Online Database for Intermediary Structures 

1930 births
2007 deaths
Belgian Ministers of State
Politicians from Antwerp
Presidents of the Senate (Belgium)
Belgian Ministers of Defence

Recipients of the Grand Cross of the Order of Leopold II
Grand Crosses 1st class of the Order of Merit of the Federal Republic of Germany